On June 28, 2022 morning Two university professors in Salahaddin University-Erbil were killed in an armed attack by a former student. In two separate shooting incidents, the suspect killed the dean of Salahadin College of Law, Karwan Ismail, and Engineering College teacher Irdis Ezzat. Erbil Governor Omed Khoshnaw said today that Ismail later died of his injuries in the hospital. and Idris Izzat murdered in his house and he was alone in his house when the killer input to his home and killed him.
The killer was a former student of Soran University. The person had been dismissed earlier.

References

June 2022 events in Iraq
Mass shootings in Iraq
Salahaddin University-Erbil